Lungley is a surname. Notable people with the surname include:

Alfred Lungley (1905–1989), British soldier
Tom Lungley (born 1979), British cricketer and umpire

See also
Langley (surname)
Longley (surname)